Helix Software Company was a New York City based software company founded in October 1986.  The company developed software tools and utilities for DOS and Windows. In 1993, Helix licensed some of its memory management technology to Microsoft for use in MS-DOS 6.0. Microsoft subsequently released Helix's memory management technology as part of the MEMMAKER and EMM386 DOS commands.

The company pioneered several technologies, including virtual memory compression systems, switching between multiple protected mode operating environments, use of off-screen video RAM, and highly recoverable fixed storage systems.

On 1 December 1997, Helix Software merged with McAfee, Network General, and PGP Corporation in a pooling of interest transaction, the resulting company was named Network Associates. Helix's products were integrated with the other companies' products as well as with products from the subsequent acquisitions of Cybermedia and Dr Solomon's Antivirus. The combined products were branded McAfee Office and McAfee Security Suite.

Notable products

DOS/Windows memory management:
 HeadRoom
 NETROOM
 Cloaking, Multimedia Cloaking, Cloaking Developer's Toolkit
 Helix Multimedia Stacker

Windows performance enhancement:
 Hurricane

Nuts & Bolts and related Windows tools:
 DiskTune hard drive optimization
 DiskMinder hard drive repair
 Stronghold encryption
 Safe & Sound automatic backup and recovery

See also
 Tech companies in the New York metropolitan area

References

Software companies based in New York City
Software companies established in 1986
Defunct software companies of the United States